Yenlin Ku (l born 1948) (sometimes spelled Yenling Ku) is a prominent feminist involved in the women's movement in Taiwan.

Education 
Ku has a B.A. from National Taiwan University, an M.A. from the Claremont Graduate University and an Ed.S. from Indiana University.

Career 
She is a teacher at the Graduate Institute for Gender Studies and an adviser to Taipei City Government. Many of her experiences and observations are collected in her blog "feminist-original".

Ku has been active in the movement since the mid-1970s. In 1982 Ku and a group of colleagues who supported gender equality established the magazine Awakening  to encourage women's self-awareness and to raise public concern about women's issues. This project was followed in 1987 by the Awakening Foundation with the intention of mobilizing more women, improving their social conditions and striving for their rights. After returning from the 1985 Nairobi conference, Ku and other women's studies scholars formed the Women's Research Program at National Taiwan University. She served as chair of the Awakening Foundation from 1997–1998 and became the first femocrat in Taiwan in the end of 1998.

Selected works

References 

Indiana University alumni
National Taiwan University alumni
Claremont Graduate University alumni
Taiwanese feminists
1948 births
Living people